Poorna is a 2017 Indian Hindi-language biographical adventure film directed by Rahul Bose. The film stars himself with Aditi Inamdar as Malavath Poorna, the youngest girl to climb Mount Everest. The film released in India on 31 March 2017 to positive reviews. The film was screened at the 2017 Palm Springs International Film Festival where it was nominated on the festival's list of "30 Best Feature Films".

Plot 
Poorna Malavath (Aditi Inamdar) belongs to a Telugu speaking tribal family in Pakala, Nizamabad district in the Telangana state of India. Her parents (mother Lakshmi and father Devidas) are farm labourers. She joins the State Social Welfare Residential Educational Institutions Society for her education. Her talent is spotted by the honest secretary of the Society Dr R.S. Praveen Kumar (Rahul Bose). The chief minister N. Kiran Kumar Reddy (Harsha Vardhan) authorises her for Operation Everest along with a Dalit mountaineer, Sandhanapalli Anand Kumar (Manoj Kumar). In preparation for climbing Mount Everest headed by Coach Shekhar Babu (Gyanendra Tripathi) and Colonel Khan (Arif Zakaria), she treks to mountains of Ladakh and Darjeeling. On 25 May 2014, Poorna scales the highest peak of Mount Everest and, aged 13 years and 11 months, becomes the youngest girl in the world to have reached the summit of Everest.

Cast 
Aditi Inamdar as Poorna
Rahul Bose as Dr. R.S. Praveen Kumar
Heeba Shah as Meena Gupta
Dhritiman Chatterjee as Alexander
S. Mariya as Priya
Harsha Vardhan as N. Kiran Kumar Reddy
Gyanendra Tripathi as Shekhar Babu
Manoj Kumar as Anand
Dr. Rayala Harischandra as Priya's father
Lakshmi Kola as Poorna's mother
Arif Zakaria as Colonel Khan
D.Raju as Poorna's sister's husband
Appaji Ambarisha Darbha as Teacher

Production 
Rahul Bose was initially not associated with the film until he was offered the role of Dr. Kumar. He liked the script and offered to direct and produce Poorna, raising funds in four months. Aditi Inamdar was chosen to play the titular role from a group of 109 girls. The film was shot in Pakala village over an 11-day period. Pakala is the village that the real-life Poorna grew up in.

Soundtrack 

The soundtrack of Poorna was composed by Salim–Sulaiman while the lyrics were written by Amitabh Bhattacharya.

Reception

Critical reception 

Poorna received a positive response from the critics based on the reviews. Neil Soans of The Times of India appreciated the film saying, "Returning to a directorial capacity after 16 years, Rahul Bose recognizes the beauty in simplicity and uses it to the film's advantage. Grounded performances combined with stirring music elevate this relatively straightforward tale, making it essential viewing not only for the young Indian woman, but for anyone looking to scale great heights against all odds." and gave it a rating of 4 stars out of 5. Sarit Ray of The Hindustan Times praised the film saying, "Poorna shows you that incredible stories can be told simply. Bollywood can learn from that." and gave the film a rating of 4 stars out of 5. Shubhra Gupta of The Indian Express lauded the movie by saying, "Fairytales do come true and the story of Poorna Malavath is the proof. Her biopic, directed by Rahul bose, does justice to the extraordinary story of a 13-year-old tribal girl climbing Mt Everest." and gave the film a rating of 3 and a half stars out of 5. Saibal Chatterjee of NDTV said that, "Poorna is a rare Hindi film that travels to the heart of rural landscape. Even rarer is the use of a smattering of Telugu in the dialogues, which, along with an effective musical score, augments the authenticity of the film's setting and soundscape. It also draws enormous strength from the deeply affecting performances by newcomer Aditi Inamdar (in the role of the resolute Poorna) and Bose himself (as the unwavering mentor firm in his belief that it is his responsibility as a bureaucrat to facilitate positive change in the lives of the most disadvantaged)." and gave the film a rating of 3 stars out of 5.

Accolades

See also 

Himalayan Mountaineering Institute
Vertical Limit
127 Hours
Cliffhanger

References 

2010s adventure drama films
2017 biographical drama films
2017 directorial debut films
2017 drama films
2017 films
2017 multilingual films
2017 thriller drama films
Disaster films based on actual events
Drama films based on actual events
Films about death
Films about Mount Everest
Films about social issues in India
Films about women in India
Films based on non-fiction books
Films scored by Salim–Sulaiman
Films set in Andhra Pradesh
Films set in Nepal
Films shot in Nepal
Films shot in Telangana
Hindi-language films based on actual events
Indian adventure drama films
Indian biographical drama films
Indian disaster films
Indian films based on actual events
Indian multilingual films
Indian survival films
Thriller films based on actual events